Electra is a rural locality in the Bundaberg Region, Queensland, Australia.

History 
Electra Provisional School opened on 12 October 1892 and closed on 1966. On 1 January 1909, it became Electra State School. It closed in 1918. Electra State School reopened in 1936, closing permanently in 1966. The school building was relocated to Airy Park State School (later renamed Elliot Heads State School) in Elliott Heads.

Woodbine State School opened on 1909 and closed circa 1914.

Education 
There are no schools in Electra. The nearest government primary school is Givelda State School in neighbouring Givelda to the east. The nearest government secondary school is Bundaberg State High School in Bundaberg South to the north-east.

References 

Bundaberg Region
Localities in Queensland